Aleksandr Andreyevich Mineyev (born 11 January 1988) is a former Russian professional football player.

Club career
At the start of his senior career he played in the Macedonian First League, first with FK Cementarnica 55 in the second half of the 2005–06 season, and then with FK Bregalnica Kraun in the following season.

He played two seasons in the Russian Football National League for FC MVD Rossii Moscow, FC Sibir Novosibirsk and FC SKA-Energiya Khabarovsk.

References

External links
 
 

1988 births
Living people
Russian footballers
Association football midfielders
FK Cementarnica 55 players
FK Bregalnica Štip players
FC Sibir Novosibirsk players
FC SKA-Khabarovsk players
FC Sokol Saratov players
FC Rostov players
FC Baikal Irkutsk players
FC Petrotrest players
Russian expatriate footballers
Expatriate footballers in North Macedonia
FC MVD Rossii Moscow players